Andrey Dmitriyevich Kryachkov (1876–1950) was a Russian and Soviet architect.

Biography 
Kryachkov was a graduate of St. Petersburg institute of civil engineering.

He was a leading architect in Novosibirsk in the first half of the 20th century.

During his life Kryachkov designed buildings in Art Nouveau, constructivist/functionalist and neoclassical styles.

Recipient of the Order of Saint Stanislaus 2nd class and 3rd class, Order of the Red Banner of Labour, Medal "For Valiant Labour in the Great Patriotic War 1941–1945"

Gallery 

1876 births
1950 deaths
20th-century Russian architects
People from Rostovsky Uyezd (Yaroslavl Governorate)
Academic staff of Tomsk Polytechnic University
Academic staff of Tomsk State University
Saint-Petersburg State University of Architecture and Civil Engineering alumni
Recipients of the Order of the Red Banner of Labour
Recipients of the Order of Saint Stanislaus (Russian), 2nd class
Recipients of the Order of Saint Stanislaus (Russian), 3rd class
Architects from the Russian Empire
Constructivist architects
Functionalist architects
Russian neoclassical architects
Russian urban planners
Soviet architects

Soviet urban planners